Jack Wynne May (23 April 1922 – 19 September 1997) was an English actor.

Early life and education
May was born in 1922 in Henley-on-Thames, and was educated at Forest School in Walthamstow. After war service with the Royal Indian Navy in British India, he was offered a place at RADA, but instead went to Merton College, Oxford. Here, with the OUDS, he played parts that included John of Gaunt in Richard II and Polonius in Hamlet.

Career
May became familiar on television as the butler William E. Simms in two series of the BBC 1 fantasy/adventure television series Adam Adamant Lives! from 1966 to 1967.

He provided the voice for Igor, long-suffering butler to Count Duckula in the cartoon series of the same name. He also appeared as the waiter Garkbit in the television version of The Hitchhiker's Guide to the Galaxy, Théoden in the 1981 BBC Radio adaptation of The Lord of the Rings, as General Hermack in the 1969 Doctor Who serial The Space Pirates, and in Bachelor Father. For 45 years the long-running BBC Radio 4 series, The Archers, featured the voice of May as Nelson Gabriel, son of Walter Gabriel, making him (at the time of his death) the fourth-longest serving soap opera star in the world. He played the voice of Muzzy in Muzzy in Gondoland and Muzzy Comes Back.

His other credits in film and television included Dr. Denny in the 1960 serial The Citadel, the sex-crazed Judge in the horror film Night After Night After Night (1970), the District Commissioner in The Man Who Would Be King (1975), and the prosecuting naval attorney in the remake of The Bounty (1984).

On stage he played many leading and supporting roles, spending five years with Birmingham Repertory Theatre during which time he attracted considerable notice in the title part of Shakespeare's Henry VI. This trilogy of plays came to the Old Vic in London, and from then on began to be far more regularly revived. For Birmingham Rep, he also played parts as diverse as Richard II, Alec in Coward's Still Life (the story better known as Brief Encounter) and the Elephant in Obey's Noah. He returned to the Old Vic for the 1958–59 season, as Shakespeare's Julius Caesar among other parts. Later stage roles included The Headmaster in A Voyage Round My Father, and Colonel Pickering in Pygmalion with Alec McCowen and Diana Rigg.

Personal life
In 1957, he married the actress Petra Davies. He died at 75, on 19 September 1997, survived by his wife, his daughter Henrietta, and his son David.

Partial filmography

 Gert and Daisy's Weekend (1942) as Old Man
 Give Me the Stars (1945) - Milkman (uncredited)
 The Oracle (1953) - Old Man
 Innocents in Paris (1953) - (uncredited)
 John Wesley (1954)
 Child's Play (1954) - Bob Crouch
 It's a Great Day (1955) - Nightwatchman (uncredited)
 Cat Girl (1957) - Richard Johnson
 The Silent Enemy (1958) - (uncredited)
 There Was a Crooked Man (1960) - Police Sergeant
 Seven Keys (1961) - Prison Officer (uncredited)
 Solo for Sparrow (1962) - Insp. Hudson
 The Traitors (1962) - Burton / 'The Traitor'
 Solo for Sparrow (1962) - MO
 A Funny Thing Happened on the Way to the Forum (1966) - Shopkeeper
 How I Won the War (1967) - Toby
 A Twist of Sand (1968) - Inspector Seekert
 Night After Night After Night (1969) - Judge Charles Lomax
 Goodbye, Mr. Chips (1969) - Price (uncredited)
 Trog (1970) - Dr. Selbourne
 The Yes Girls (1971) - King Reiter
 Big Zapper (1973) - Jeremiah Horn
 The Man Who Would Be King (1975) - District Commissioner
 The Seven-Per-Cent Solution (1976) - Dr. Schultz
 Sammy's Super T-Shirt (1978) - Sportsmaster
 A Horseman Riding By (TV Series) (1978) - Lord Gilroy
 The Return of the Soldier (1982) - Brigadier General
 A Swarm in May (1983) - Mr. Ardent the Headmaster
 The Bounty (1984) - Prosecuting Captain
 The Shooting Party (1985) - Sir Harry Stamp
 The Doctor and the Devils (1985) - Dr. Stevens
 Hard Road (1988) - Psychiatrist
 Willie's War (1994) - Grandfather

References

External links
 
 

1922 births
1997 deaths
20th-century English male actors
Alumni of Merton College, Oxford
English male radio actors
English male television actors
Male actors from Oxfordshire
People educated at Forest School, Walthamstow
People from Henley-on-Thames
Indian military personnel of World War II